Mahmoud Khedri 'محمود خذري' (14 March 1948 – 23 July 2021) was an Algerian politician. He served as Minister of Industry from 2005 until 2007 and Minister of Relations with the Algerian Parliament from 2007 to 2014. He also served as a member of the People's National Assembly from 1997 until 2003.

Khedri died from COVID-19 on 23 July 2021, aged 73.

References

1948 births
2021 deaths
Algerian politicians
Government ministers of Algeria
Members of the People's National Assembly
Deaths from the COVID-19 pandemic in Algeria